Clarion Municipal Airport  is a city-owned public-use airport located one nautical mile (1.85 km) northwest of the central business district of Clarion, a city in Wright County, Iowa, United States. This airport is included in the FAA's National Plan of Integrated Airport Systems for 2009–2013, which categorized it as a general aviation facility.

Although many U.S. airports use the same three-letter location identifier for the FAA and IATA, this facility is assigned CAV by the FAA but has no designation from the IATA (which assigned CAV to Cazombo Airport in Angola).

Facilities and aircraft 
It has one runway designated 14/32 with a concrete surface measuring 3,515 by 60 feet (1,071 x 18 m).

For the 12-month period ending May 6, 2009, the airport had 3,750 general aviation aircraft operations, an average of 10 per day. At that time there were 12 aircraft based at this airport: 75% single-engine, 17% multi-engine and 8% ultralight.

References

External links 
 Aerial image as of 16 April 1994 from USGS The National Map
 

Airports in Iowa
Transportation buildings and structures in Wright County, Iowa